Ermanno Scaramuzzi (2 December 1927 in Biella – 2 July 1991) was an Italian professional football player and coach.

Honours
 Serie A champion: 1949/50, 1951/52.

1927 births
1991 deaths
Italian footballers
Serie A players
Juventus F.C. players
Atalanta B.C. players
Brescia Calcio players
Hellas Verona F.C. players
U.S. Salernitana 1919 players
Italian football managers
A.S.D. La Biellese managers
Association football forwards
A.S.D. La Biellese players